Pedro Alfonso de León (c. 1196 – 1226) was a Leonese Spanish noble of the House of Burgundy. He was, according to many historians, the illegitimate son of Alfonso IX of León. He was elected Grand Master of the Order of Santiago in 1225, succeeding Fernán Pérez Chacín in the role.

Biography 
His exact date of birth is not known, but is estimated to be around 1196. There is also controversy amongst historians surrounding his true identity. Some chroniclers hold that he was the illegitimate son of Alfonso IX of León and an unknown woman, while others maintain that his mother was Aldonza Martínez de Silva, daughter of Martín Gómez de Silva and his wife Urraca Ruiz de Cabrera. Still other historians have cast doubt on Pedro Alfonso's status as Alfonso IX's illegitimate son, that he existed at all or that he was a Grand Master of the Order of Santiago.

Marriage and descendancy 
The name of his wife is not known, and historians disagree over whether Pedro Alfonso had one or two children. His children were as follows.

 Diego Alfonso de León. Married Urraca de Tenorio, Lady of Tenorio and Cotovad.
 Alfonso Pérez de León (born c. 1215 – d. ?). Navarrese noble from Monreal. Married Inés Gutiérrez de Páramo.

See also 
 Order of Santiago

Notes

References

Bibliography

External links 
 

1196 births
1226 deaths
Pedro
Spanish untitled nobility
Grand Masters of the Order of Santiago